Bow City is a former village located in southeast Alberta, Canada.

History 
The Village of Bow City was incorporated on July 13, 1914 through a proclamation issued by Wilfred Gariepy, Minister of Municipal Affairs. It subsequently dissolved on April 17, 1918.

Bow City impact crater

According to Wired magazine a paper presented at an American Geophysical Union Conference in December 2012 by Wei Xie of the University of Alberta described a buried crater under Bow City.

Demographics 

In the 1916 Census of Prairie Provinces, Bow City had a population of 28.

See also 
List of former urban municipalities in Alberta

References

External links 
Bow City – Ghost Town
Bow City Townsite - 1910

Ghost towns in Alberta
Former villages in Alberta
Vulcan County